Novel is a 2008 Indian Malayalam romantic drama film produced and directed by East Coast Vijayan in his directorial debut.

Plot 
Sethunath (Jayaram) is a prosperous business man and also a writer. However, when his creation titled 'Swantham' becomes a best seller and bags the commonwealth awards. The writer is the least interested so much so that he is not even aware who translated his work & earned the award for the book.

Aneesa, a journalist, is determined to get a personal interview with her favorite writer Sethu and does not hesitate to get it at the expense of bribing Sethu's secretary Subramaniam Swamy and finally succeeds. Luckily for her, Sethu is impressed with her resilience and also the fact that she comes from the same orphanage that he hailed from makes him open his heart. He talks about his failed marriage and Priyanandini (Sadha) whom he encounters during the making of a lottery commercial. Gradually, Priya reaches the pinnacle of stardom with the support of Sethu.

In this process, both of them fall in love with each other and decide to get married. Manju (Shari), Sethu's wife from the US does not allow this. What does Manju do forms the rest of the story.

Cast 
 Jayaram as Sethunath        
 Sadha as Priyanandini(Voice by Praveena )
 Sharika Menon as Manju
 Jagathy Sreekumar
 Nedumudi Venu
 Sarika
 Saiju Kurup as Lekshmanan
 Bindu Panicker
 Indrans
 Devan
 M. Jayachandran as himself in a telephone call (cameo)

Soundtrack
"Onninumallathe (Duet)" - K. J. Yesudas, Manjari
"Poonkuyile Poonkuyile" - Shweta Mohan
"Enninakkiliyude" - K. J. Yesudas
"Urangan Neeyenikku (Male)" - K. J. Yesudas
"Ithramelenne Nee" - K. J. Yesudas, Sujatha Mohan
"Onninumallathe (Female)" - Manjari
"Urangan Neeyenikku (Female)" - Manjari
"Onninumallathe (Male)" - K. J. Yesudas
"Arikilillenkilum" - K. J. Yesudas

External links 
 
 https://www.indiaglitz.com/novel-preview-malayalamfont-movie-9463
 https://www.nowrunning.com/movie/4382/malayalam/novel/1468/review.htm
https://www.indiaglitz.com/novel-review-malayalam-movie-9463

2008 films
2000s Malayalam-language films
Films scored by M. Jayachandran